Bboongbboong (also called 'Farting King Pung Pung') is a children's television program produced by Educational Broadcasting System (EBS). Broadcasting began in March 2000. The show attempts to help children to think and develop their language, expression, and social skills. The characters such as Bboong Bboong-E let the children join in the TV show. The main character Bboongbboong-E's fart has many magical effects.

Characters 
 Jajan Bro: MC of the show
 Bboongbboong-E 만화 캐릭터
 Ppickppick-E
 Chichi
 Bboongsoon-E
 Bboongdor-i
 Kao
 Congraturation bangbangbang
 Lalala Band
 Exiting Band
 Fun Fun Band
 Egu
 Mukku
 Ppangku & Ppongku
 Aeongttungsem
 Bboong-car
 Bboong-chi
 Donidoni
 Hoshi
 Tamtam
 Ipari

Former characters 

Bboongdol-E and Bboongsoon-E were dropped to reduce animation costs. Recently, Bboongsoon-E returned. In one episode, Bboongsoon-E and Bboonbboong-E got married.

Band 
Usually the band called ‘’ provided music for the show, although ‘Fun Fun Band’ also performed.

Daily Episodes 
 Monday-bbongbong-ee song show
 Tuesday-body play
 Wednesday-good habit play

Awards 
 Year 2001 Korean Best television show 
 Year 2002 Korean best television character
 Year 2003 Korean best television character

Reference List 

South Korean children's television shows